was a Japanese athlete. She competed in the women's shot put at the 1960 Summer Olympics.

References

External links
 

1937 births
2021 deaths
Japanese female shot putters
Olympic female shot putters
Olympic athletes of Japan
Athletes (track and field) at the 1960 Summer Olympics
Asian Games silver medalists for Japan
Asian Games medalists in athletics (track and field)
Athletes (track and field) at the 1962 Asian Games
Medalists at the 1962 Asian Games
Japan Championships in Athletics winners
Sportspeople from Iwate Prefecture
20th-century Japanese women
21st-century Japanese women